Tom is a programming language particularly well-suited for programming various transformations on tree structures and XML-based documents. Tom is a language extension which adds new matching primitives to C and Java as well as support for rewrite rules systems. The rules can be controlled using a strategy language.

Tom is good for:
 programming by pattern matching
 developing compilers and domain-specific languages (DSL)
 transforming XML documents
 implementing rule-based systems
 describing algebraic transformations

References

External links
 Tom language website
 Tom gforge website
 Tutorial and Reference Manual

Programming language implementation
Pattern matching
Pattern matching programming languages
Term-rewriting programming languages
Graph rewriting